Litsonero is a 2009 Filipino drama film.

Cast
Paolo Contis as Fidel
Karylle as Carmen
Maricel Laxa as Viril
Michael de Mesa as Pinoy
Gerard Pirrazas as Roger
Jun Urbano as Mang Carding
Joanne Quintas as Cora
Isabelle de Leon as Sheila
Jake Vargas as Itok
Leter Llansang as Benjie
Alfred Labados as Tikboy
Analin Bantug as Fidel's Date
Jinky Laurel as Bianca
Oselle Punla as Mayor's Wife
John Alba as Mayor Virgilio Robles
Jed Sicangco as Moises
Rolly Gallo as Barangay Captain
RJ Lacson as Mayor's Photographer
Panoy de Arao as Cop in Bakery
Aris Tinio as TODA Boy
Mark Espinosa as TODA Boy
Jason Santos as TODA Boy
James Lachica as TODA Boy
Michael Arguelles as TODA Boy
Jimmy Capacio as TODA Boy

External links

Philippine drama films
Films directed by Lore Reyes